Cithareloma is a genus of flowering plants belonging to the family Brassicaceae.

Its native range is Western and Central Asia to Pakistan.

Species:

Cithareloma lehmannii 
Cithareloma vernum

References

Brassicaceae
Brassicaceae genera
Taxa named by Alexander von Bunge